William Courtney may refer to:

 William Leonard Courtney (1850–1928), English author
 William B. Courtney (1894–1966), American screenwriter
 William Harrison Courtney (born 1944), American diplomat
 William Prideaux Courtney (1845–1913), English biographer

See also
 William Courtenay (disambiguation)